The DB City Mall is a shopping complex located in the city of Bhopal, Madhya Pradesh, India. It is situated near Maharana Pratap Nagar.

Spread over 13 lacs sq.ft of floor space, DB City is one of the largest shopping centers in central India. It is the first shopping mall in Bhopal and opened in Aug, 2010. The mall is located at the central business district. 

The mall experiences over 10 lacs foot traffic per month, which goes up to 18 lacs during holiday season (Diwali, Christmas etc). DB Mall provides shopping, entertainment, and leisure activities.

Details
The mall consists of 7 floors, as well as a ground floor and lower ground floor. Located in great location, with its nice architecture design it’s famous for people to come and do shopping.

It is operated by The Dainik Bhaskar Group and has a six-screen multiplex operated by Cinepolis.

References 

Shopping malls in Bhopal
2010 establishments in Madhya Pradesh
Shopping malls established in 2010